Pacific Airlines Joint Stock Aviation Company (operating as Pacific Airlines) is a low-cost airline headquartered in Tan Binh District, Ho Chi Minh City, Vietnam. With its hub at Tan Son Nhat International Airport, Ho Chi Minh City, operates scheduled domestic and international services along with charter flights.

Destinations
This is a list of destinations flown by Pacific Airlines passenger flights. It does not include codeshares.

References

External links

Vietnam Tourism

Pacific Airlines